D. Bruce Wharton served as the acting United States' Under Secretary of State for Public Diplomacy and Public Affairs from December 8, 2016, to  July 2017. He was preceded by Richard Stengel and succeeded by Steve Goldstein. He was the 2011 recipient of the Edward R. Murrow Award for Excellence in Public Diplomacy.

A graduate of the University of Texas in Austin, Wharton was the U.S. Ambassador to Zimbabwe from September 2012 to November 2015.

References

External links

Living people
United States Under Secretaries of State
University of Texas at Austin alumni
Ambassadors of the United States to Zimbabwe
Year of birth missing (living people)